Marek Witold Suski (born 11 June 1958, in Grójec) is a Polish politician. He was elected to the Sejm on 25 September 2005, getting 12,018 votes in 17 Radom district as a candidate from the Law and Justice list.

He was also a member of Sejm since 2001.

In 2021, a Polish woman died from septic miscarriage because a Polish hospital refused to perform an abortion on her, even though her fetus was lacking amniotic fluid, due to a recently passed law in Poland by Suski's party. After the woman's death, Suski said, "Medical errors occur ... and unfortunately women sometimes still die in childbirth."

See also
Members of Polish Sejm 2005-2007

References

External links
Marek Suski - parliamentary page - includes declarations of interest, voting record, and transcripts of speeches.

1958 births
Living people
People from Grójec
Law and Justice politicians
Centre Agreement politicians
Members of the Polish Sejm 2001–2005
Members of the Polish Sejm 2005–2007
Members of the Polish Sejm 2007–2011
Members of the Polish Sejm 2011–2015
Members of the Polish Sejm 2015–2019
Members of the Polish Sejm 2019–2023